Klaus Volk (born 29 April 1944) is a German jurist, professor at University of Munich and defense lawyer specialized in commercial-law-related criminal cases.

His doctorate thesis at University of Munich 1970 was about philosophy of law.

Among his clients were Josef Ackermann (see Mannesmann Trial), Joachim Zahn and Boris Becker.

Volk was critical towards the "security measures" of Wolfgang Schäuble against terrorists.

Notes

External links

"The principles of criminal procedure and post-modern society: contradictions and perspectives". Paper delivered at the International Society for the reform of Criminal Law in the Hague, Netherlands, 2003.

1944 births
Academic staff of the Ludwig Maximilian University of Munich
German scholars
Living people